The Ina is a river in northwestern Poland, a right tributary of the Oder River.

The origins of the river are in Insko Lake (Polish: jezioro Ińsko), and it flows through a succession of smaller lakes. The confluence of Ina River is localized in Police town, near Szczecin. It has a length of 129 km, and the basin area of the Ina is 2189 km2.

The main towns situated on the Ina River are:
 Ińsko
 Goleniów
 Stargard with the famous Stargard Mill Gate
 Police, Poland (on the confluence of Ina River into the Oder)

In Pomeranian history, the Ihna from 1295 to 1464 separated Pomerania-Stettin and Pomerania-Wolgast. Tributaries of the Ina are: Krępiel, Mała Ina, Reczek, Struga Goleniowska.

See also
Mała Ina

References

Rivers of Poland
Rivers of West Pomeranian Voivodeship